Union Tank Car Company or UTLX is a railway equipment leasing, rail car maintenance, and rail car manufacturing company headquartered in metro Chicago, Illinois. A direct descendant of Standard Oil, the firm today is owned by Berkshire Hathaway.

Union Tank Car Company was founded in 1866 by Captain Jacob J. Vandergrift, in response to the economic activities of John D. Rockefeller in the years leading up to his creation of Standard Oil.  Vandergrift was involved in the conflicts in the oil regions of Western Pennsylvania in the 1860s–1870s. Eventually, Union Tank Car Company and Vandergrift's other holdings, which included pipeline and riverboat transport companies, merged with the company that later became Standard Oil. Rockefeller, once Captain Vandergrift's nemesis, made him Vice President of Standard Oil.  The town of Vandergrift, Pennsylvania, built in 1895 by steel company president George G. McMurtry to house his workers, was named in Vandergrift's honor.

TransUnion was formed as a holding company in 1968 to hold Union Tank Car Company. TransUnion soon began acquiring credit information and information management companies as a second major investment. The Marmon Group acquired TransUnion in 1981, spinning off the TransUnion name and the financial portion of the holding company to Madison Dearborn Partners in the 1990s. Union Tank Car Company is still owned by Marmon, which in turn is now a 100% owned subsidiary of Berkshire Hathaway.

See also

 Procor - Canadian subsidiary of Union Tank Car

References

External links
UTLX corporate site
 Chicago History thumbnail
 Victorian Vandergrift Museum and Historical Society site
 Alle-Kiski Today (Western Pennsylvania regional magazine)

Companies based in Chicago
Rolling stock leasing companies